The United Theological College of the West Indies (UTCWI) is an ecumenical seminary training male and female clergy in Kingston, Jamaica, for Anglican and Protestant denominations throughout the Caribbean.

History
The college was founded in 1966.  It moved to its current, custom-built site adjacent to University of the West Indies (UWI) Mona campus in the early 1970s.  The Roman Catholic St. Michael's Theological College was built alongside at the same time.

It is affiliated to the University of the West Indies, forming the Department of Theology in the Faculty of Arts and Education (formerly Arts and General Studies).

It offers a Doctor of Ministry degree in co-operation with Columbia Theological Seminary in Georgia, United States.

Notable alumni

 Neville Callam, General Secretary of the Baptist World Alliance
 Charles Davidson, Bishop of Guyana since 2015
 Howard Gregory, Bishop of Jamaica and the Cayman Islands since 2012, and Archbishop of the West Indies since 2019
 Stanley Redwood, 10th President of the Senate of Jamaica
 Adlyn White, Moderator of the Synod of the United Church in Jamaica and the Cayman Islands

References

External links
 Official site

Seminaries and theological colleges in Jamaica
Education in Kingston, Jamaica
Buildings and structures in Saint Andrew Parish, Jamaica
Alumni of the United Theological College, Jamaica